Birgitte Kiær Ahring (born July 22, 1953) is a Danish biologist and researcher in biofuel. Since 2008, she has been employed as a professor at the Department of Chemistry and Bioscience at Aalborg University Copenhagen.

Education 
Ahring graduated as cand.scient. in biology at Copenhagen University in 1982. In 1986, she acquired a PhD in microbiology, also from Copenhagen University.

Career 
In 1986, Ahring became head-scientist at ‘The Nordic Council of Ministers’ biofuel research program. Also, she was employed at the Technical Folk High School of Denmark the same year.
 
Ahring started working as an environmental consultant at the United Nations (UN) focusing on Africa and Asia in 1992. The following year, in 1993, she was employed as a lecturer in environmental engineering at Technical University of Denmark.
 
In 1997, she started working as a professor in environmental engineering at University of California, Los Angeles, US, and at the same time worked at the research center, Biocentrum, at the Technical University of Denmark.
 
In 2004, Ahring became the leader of the Danish Center for Biofuels. Later, in 2006, she became the chief executive and owner of the company, Biogasol. Simultaneously, she started leading the Maxifuel project at the Technical University of Denmark.
 
As part of a collaboration between Washington State University and Aalborg University to develop a new type of biofuel, Ahring was employed as the director of both research centres, in 2008.

References 

1953 births
Living people
Academic staff of Aalborg University
Danish women biologists
University of Copenhagen alumni
 Danish expatriates in the United States
 Washington State University faculty